Perso-Arabic Script Code for Information Interchange (PASCII) is one of the Indian government standards for encoding languages using writing systems based on Perso-Arabic alphabet, in particular Kashmiri, Persian, Sindhi and Urdu. The ISCII encoding was originally intended to cover both the Brahmi-derived writing systems of India and the Arabic-based systems, but it was subsequently decided to encode the Arabic-based writing systems separately.

PASCII has not been widely used outside certain government institutions and has now been rendered largely obsolete by Unicode. Unicode uses a separate block for each writing system and largely preserves the PASCII layout within each block.

Codepage layout 

The following table shows the character set for PASCII. Each character is shown with its decimal code and its Unicode equivalent.

References 
 PASCII at Center for Development of Advanced Computing

Character encoding
Character sets